Michael Sarris (born 14 April 1946) is a Greek Cypriot economist and politician. He earned his B.Sc. in Economics at the London School of Economics & Political Science (LSE). He later continued his studies in the United States where he obtained his Doctorate in Economics at Wayne State University.

Career

In 1972, he joined the research department of the Central Bank of Cyprus. In early 1974, he moved to the Bank of Cyprus to work in planning and project analysis. His international career took off in 1975 when Sarris was employed by the World Bank. In the course of his career, his work covered a broad range of sectors in Africa, Latin America and East Asia. His duties included supervision of the design of the overall country strategies of the Bank, the provision of advice on policy issues for economic and social development, the elaboration of programmes for structural adjustments and the development of economic policy dialogue between the Bank and the national authorities of countries seeking World Bank assistance. At the end of 2004, he retired from the World Bank as Department Director.

In September 2005, President Tassos Papadopoulos appointed Sarris Minister of Finance, a position he held until the change of government in March 2008.

Change of currency
During Sarris' first tenure as Minister of Finance, Cyprus prepared for and introduced the euro as its national currency.  An aggressive austerity programme helped turn a fiscal deficit of 6.3% in 2003 into a surplus of 1.2% in 2008, and reduced inflation to 4.7%.

Sarris on Cyprus' entry to the eurozone:

Cypriot financial crisis

In 2012, between January and August, Michael Sarris took a more active role in the recovery of Cyprus Popular Bank. Cyprus Popular Bank made unwise investments in Greece and urgently needed €1.8 billion ($2.25 billion) in bailout money in 2012.

Sarris was reappointed Minister of Finance by President Nicos Anastasiades on 28 February 2013. He resigned on 2 April after completing talks on a controversial bailout package for Cyprus.

Allegations of sexual misconduct
On 15 October 2011, Sarris was accused by the internationally unrecognized entity of Northern Cyprus of sexual misconduct with a minor and was detained for three days. Northern Cyprus had previously made similar allegations.

Business interests
 Former Non-Executive Chairman and Chairman of Nominations Committee Cyprus Popular Bank Public Co Ltd
 Non-Executive Independent Director and Member of Audit Committee AFI Development PLC
 Non-Executive Director at FxPro
 Director, Chairman of Audit Committee and Member of Conflicts Committee at Navios Maritime Partners Lp
 Member of the Board of Takis & Louki Nemitsas Foundation

References

1946 births
Living people
Cyprus Ministers of Finance
Greek Cypriot people
World Bank people